Ganim Khan (6 July 1931 – 23 November 1984) was a Guyanese cricketer. He played in one first-class match for British Guiana in 1952/53.

See also
 List of Guyanese representative cricketers

References

External links
 

1931 births
1984 deaths
Guyanese cricketers
Guyana cricketers